The 1982 Pacific Tigers football team represented the University of the Pacific (UOP) in the 1982 NCAA Division I-A football season as a member of the Pacific Coast Athletic Association.

Led by head coach Bob Toledo, in his fourth and final year, the Tigers played their home games at Pacific Memorial Stadium in Stockton, California. They finished the season with two wins and nine losses (2–9, 2–4 PCAA, fifth), and were outscored 200–330.

Toledo announced his resignation several days before the final game, a 31–0 home shutout win over Cal State Fullerton.

Schedule

Notes

References

Pacific
Pacific Tigers football seasons
Pacific Tigers football